Minnie and Moo: The Attack of the Easter Bunnies is a children's picture book in the Minnie and Moo series and is written and illustrated by Denys Cazet.

Plot
Minnie hears the farmer saying that he is too old to be the Easter Bunny. The cows try to find a substitute because the grandchildren are expecting an egg hunt. When all the animals turn them down, the job goes to Minnie and Moo, but the other animals soon join them.

Reception
Marilyn Taniguchi, of School Library Journal, reviewed the book saying, "Cazet's springlike pastels and comically cartoony figures illuminate the fun goings-on, but it's the silly dialogue that carries the day. Cazet's lovably offbeat characters follow in the "hoof" steps of Bernard Wiseman's Morris the Moose and James Marshall's Fox." A Kirkus Reviews review says, "Cazet's cockeyed good cheer is in fine form here--a simple pleasure of verbal dexterity--as is his art: Elvis the chicken's costume--bedraggled rabbit ears crowning his scrawny head--is worth framing." Carolyn Phelan of Booklist reviewed the book saying, "funny. A treat for independent readers, who will request previous Minnie and Moo books, and a great read-aloud for preschoolers at Easter."

References

2004 children's books
American picture books
Children's fiction books
Easter fiction
Holiday-themed children's books